Christopher Guerrero Banchero (born January 24, 1989) is a Filipino-American professional basketball player for the Meralco Bolts of the Philippine Basketball Association (PBA). He was drafted 5th overall by Alaska in the 2014 PBA draft.

High school and college career
Banchero was a key player for state 3A champion O'Dea High School, where he averaged 15.1 points for the Fighting Irish, who went 25–5. After his senior year in high school, he committed to play for Seattle Pacific University men's basketball program under coach Ryan Looney.

In his junior year at Seattle Pacific, he was named a Division II All-American, after he led the Falcons with a 19.6-point scoring average that was the second-highest figure in the Great Northwest Athletic Conference. He also led the team to a GNAC Championship and a spot in the NCAA Division II tournament in 2010, after posting a 13–3 GNAC record to capture its first outright league championship since 2006.  During his senior year, he posted phenomenal scoring performances of 42, 38, 34, 33, 31, and 30. He was well on his way to being named the D-II National Player of the Year when his senior season was cut short by an ACL injury in January 2011.

He ended his college career as the No. 8 all-time scorer in SPU history. He graduated with a degree of International Communications in Business.

Professional career

San Miguel Beermen (ABL) (2011–2013)
Banchero was recruited by San Miguel Beermen in the ASEAN Basketball League after graduating in college.  The Philippine team already noticed him while playing for SPU's varsity team and for the Italian team in the professional division. At that time, he was gunning for a career in the NBA, trying out his luck in several teams. On May 6, 2012, Banchero recorded 18 points and 15 assists in a 111–104 OT win over the Kuala Lumpur Dragons.

While playing two seasons for the Beermen, he teamed up with Asi Taulava, Eric Menk, June Mar Fajardo, JR Cawaling, and other ex-PBA stars and led the team to the 2013 ABL Championship, defeating the Indonesia Warriors.  He was also awarded as the Finals MVP.

Boracay Rum Waves (PBA D-League)
After the ABL season ended in 2013, he set his sights in playing in the PBA. However, PBA rules required Fil-foreign players aged 25 years old or below to play in at least two conferences in the PBA D-League before becoming eligible for the draft.  He initially signed a contract with PBA D-League team Blackwater Sports, however, due to a league provision that incoming players must apply through the draft, he ended up being picked top overall and signed to a contract by Boracay Rum Waves. In his D-League debut, he posted an impressive stat line of 15 points, six rebounds, and four assists. His contract with the Tanduay franchise lasted until after the end of the 2014 PBA D-League Foundation Cup.

Alaska Aces (2014–2019)

After his stint in the D-League, he became eligible for the PBA Draft. During the 2014 PBA draft, he was earlier tipped to go as high as No. 2 in the draft, but some strange twists saw him land at No. 5 overall. He was drafted by Alaska.

On September 9, 2014, he signed a 1-year contract with the Aces. After consecutive finals appearances, Banchero extended  his contract for another year in September 2015 in a reported 2.7 million peso deal.

On September 16, 2016, Banchero, again, extended his tenure with the Aces. This time, to a longer three-year deal. Terms were not disclosed. The Fil-Italian cager stated that it was an "easy decision" stating "he is very happy with Alaska." He credited the coaching staff and his teammates as the main reason he stayed with the team and hopes he will finish his career with Alaska.

Magnolia Hotshots (2019–2020)
On November 3, 2019, the Aces traded Banchero to the Magnolia Hotshots for Rodney Brondial and Robert Herndon.

Phoenix Super LPG Fuel Masters (2021)
On February 17, 2021, Banchero, along with 2021 first round pick and 2021 second round pick, was traded to the Phoenix Super LPG Fuel Masters for Calvin Abueva and 2021 first round pick. On February 1, 2022, Banchero became an unrestricted free agent.

Meralco Bolts (2022–present)
On February 2, 2022, Banchero signed a three-year contract with the Meralco Bolts. He first rejected a new three-year contract extension with former team Phoenix before signing with Meralco.

Career statistics

ABL

|-
| align=center | 2011–12
| align=left | San Miguel 
| 11 || 27.6 || .509 || .182 || .619 || 2.3 || 6.6 || 3.1 || .0 || 12.7
|-
| align=center | 2012–13
| align=left | San Miguel
| 23 || 28.7 || .417 || .292 || .691 || 2.8 || 3.9 || 2.1 || .0 || 14.9

PBA
As of the end of 2021 season

Season-by-season averages

|-
| align=left | 
| align=left | Alaska 
| 58 || 20.2 || .406 || .150 || .657 || 3.3 || 2.2 || .8 || .0 || 7.0
|-
| align=left | 
| align=left | Alaska 
| 60 || 22.7 || .459 || .364 || .687 || 3.5 || 2.6 || .9 || .0 || 9.6
|-
| align=left | 
| align=left | Alaska 
| 25 || 25.5 || .406 || .270 || .672 || 3.2 || 4.1 || .8 || .2 || 9.1
|-
| align=left | 
| align=left | Alaska 
| 44 || 30.3 || .448 || .327 || .677 || 4.2 || 5.9 || 1.2 || .1 || 12.1
|-
| align=left rowspan=2| 
| align=left | Alaska
| rowspan=2|38 || rowspan=2|30.8 || rowspan=2|.400 || rowspan=2|.313 || rowspan=2|.683 || rowspan=2|4.3 || rowspan=2|4.9 || rowspan=2|.8 || rowspan=2|.0 || rowspan=2|13.3
|-
| align=left | Magnolia
|-
| align=left | 
| align=left | Magnolia
| 12 || 26.4 || .403 || .233 || .587 || 2.9 || 3.5 || .8 || .1 || 10.8
|-
| align=left rowspan=2| 
| align=left | Phoenix 
| rowspan=2|33 || rowspan=2|27.4 || rowspan=2|.431 || rowspan=2|.270 || rowspan=2|.636 || rowspan=2|3.2 || rowspan=2|3.5 || rowspan=2|.9 || rowspan=2|.0 || rowspan=2|10.7
|-
| align=left | Meralco
|-
|-class=sortbottom
| align="center" colspan=2 | Career
| 270 || 25.5 || .426 || .294 || .666 || 3.6 || 3.7 || .9 || .0 || 10.1

Personal life
Banchero was born in Seattle, Washington to a Filipino mother, Jacqueline Guerrero, and a father of Italian descent. His paternal cousin, Paolo Banchero, was the first overall pick of the 2022 NBA draft and plays for the Orlando Magic. They both won championships at O'Dea High School.

References

1989 births
Living people
Alaska Aces (PBA) draft picks
Alaska Aces (PBA) players
American men's basketball players
American sportspeople of Filipino descent
American people of Italian descent
ASEAN Basketball League players
Basketball players from Seattle
Citizens of the Philippines through descent
Filipino men's basketball players
Magnolia Hotshots players
Philippine Basketball Association All-Stars
Phoenix Super LPG Fuel Masters players
Point guards
Seattle Pacific Falcons men's basketball players
Shooting guards
Meralco Bolts players